Oklahoma Question 788, the Oklahoma Medical Marijuana Legalization Initiative, was a 2018 ballot measure on the June 26 ballot (alongside primaries for various statewide offices) to legalize medical marijuana in the state of Oklahoma. It passed with over 56% "yes" votes.

Contents
The proposal was listed on ballots as follows:

Results

See also
List of Oklahoma ballot measures
List of 2018 United States cannabis reform proposals

References

External links
 

question 788
2018 ballot measures
Oklahoma ballot measures
2018 cannabis law reform
Cannabis ballot measures in the United States